The Sehuencas water frog (Telmatobius yuracare) is a species of frog in the family Telmatobiidae. It is endemic to Bolivia. Its natural habitats are subtropical or tropical moist montane forest, rivers, and freshwater marshes. It is threatened by habitat loss. No individuals were encountered in the wild between 2008 and 2019.

Conservation work 
Conservation of the Sehuencas water frog has been a focus of the K'ayra Center, run by herpetologist Teresa Camacho Badani at the Museo de Historia Natural Alcide d'Orbigny (MHNC) in Cochabamba.

A single male Sehuencas water frog, nicknamed "Romeo," was collected from the wild in 2009 and housed at the K'ayra Center at the Museo de Historia Natural Alcide d'Orbigny (MHNC). There were fears that Romeo was the last of his kind, an endling. Bolivian conservationists had long been looking for other Sehuencas water frog individuals, particularly females, in hopes of creating a captive breeding program. To raise awareness and money about the plight of the Sehuencas water frog, conservationists from Global Wildlife Conservation and the Bolivian Amphibian Initiative created a profile for Romeo on Match.com, an online dating website. In January 2019, an expedition headed by Badani in a Bolivian cloud forest led to the discovery of five more individuals: three males and two females. The re-discovered frogs will be treated against chytridiomycosis, a fungal disease causing widespread decline of amphibians. After treatment, Romeo will be introduced to a female called Juliet. Despite this, there are concerns that there are too few frogs left in the wild for a sustainable long-term population, and thus captive breeding is considered the best way to restore the species.

References

External links
Romeo's profile on a dating website

yuracare
Amphibians of the Andes
Amphibians of Bolivia
Endemic fauna of Bolivia
Amphibians described in 1994
Taxonomy articles created by Polbot
Taxa named by Ignacio J. De la Riva